Angang may refer to:

Angang-eup, a town in Gyeongju, South Korea
Anshan Iron and Steel Group Corporation, or Ansteel Group, major Chinese steel producer
Angang Steel Company, a listed subsidiary of Anshan Iron and Steel Group